Dirca decipiens, the Ozark leatherwood, is a deciduous shrub endemic to northwestern Arkansas, southeastern Kansas, and southwestern Missouri.  It is distinguished from the more widespread eastern leatherwood by its sessile fruits and finely hairy leaves and stems.

References

Thymelaeoideae